This is a list of aviators by nickname.

A
 "Aggy" – Noel Agazarian, British, Battle of Britain ace
 "Assi" – Hans Hahn, German fighter pilot during World War II

B
 "Bake" – V. H. Baker, British pilot and aircraft designer
 "The Balloon Buster"  – Frank Luke, American World War I fighter ace
 "Bam" – C. S. Bamberger, British RAF World War II pilot
 "Barron" – John Worrall, British World War II RAF pilot
 "Beazle" – Hugh John Beazley, Battle of Britain pilot
 "Bee" – Roland Beamont, Battle of Britain pilot
 "Ben" – George Bennions, Battle of Britain ace
 "Big Joe" – Joe McCarthy, RAF Bomber Command pilot (617 Squadron) in the Second World War
 "Bing" – K. B. B. Cross, British World War II RAF pilot
 "Bird" – Herbert Carmichael Irwin, Irish commander of British airships including R101
 "Black Swallow of Death" – Eugene Bullard, African-American World War I fighter pilot
 "The Black Devil" – Erich Hartmann, German fighter ace
 "Blondie" – Arnold Walker, British World War II RAF pilot
 "Bo" – Elwyn King, Australian World War I fighter ace
 "Bobbi" – Evelyn Trout, American aviator
 "Bomber" – Arthur T. Harris, British commander of RAF Bomber Command  during World War II
 "Bomber George" – Harold L. George, USAAC precision bombing specialist (to distinguish him from "Fighter" George)
 "Boom" – Hugh Trenchard, British World War I Royal Flying Corps general and founder of the Royal Air Force (for his loud voice)
 "Boy" 
 Peter Mould, British Second World War fighter ace
 Geoffrey Wellum, British Second World War fighter pilot
 "Bubi" (German, "young boy", "kid")
Erich Hartmann, German fighter ace
Alfred Schreiber, German jet ace
 "Buck" – Robert McNair, Canadian fighter ace
 "Bud" – George E. Day, American POW
 "Bully" – Emil Lang, World War 2 Luftwaffe fighter ace
 "Bunny" – Christopher Currant, British RAF fighter ace in World War II
 "Butch" 
Arthur T. Harris, British commander of RAF Bomber Command during World War II (from "butcher"; affectionately given by his men)
Edward O'Hare, American World War II fighter ace and Medal of Honor recipient
 "Butcher" – Arthur T. Harris, British commander of RAF Bomber Command (Air Chief Marshal) during World War II (affectionately given by his men)
 "Buzz"
Edwin E. Aldrin, Jr., American aviator and astronaut
 George Beurling, Canadian RAF fighter ace (a nickname he never acknowledged)

C
 "Cats Eyes" – John Cunningham, Battle of Britain pilot
 "Chappie" – Daniel James, Jr., American Air Force general
 "Chuck" – Charles Elwood Yeager, World War II USAAF fighter ace and first pilot to break the sound barrier in level flight
 "Cobber" – Edgar J. Kain, Second World War RAF fighter ace
 "Cobra" – Ronald Stein, USAF fighter ace
 "Cocky" – Hugh Dundas, British Second World War RAF fighter ace
 "Cowboy" – Howard Peter Blatchford, Battle of Britain pilot
 "Crow" – Denis Crowley-Milling, Battle of Britain pilot
 "Cloudy" – Werner Christie, Norwegian fighter ace

D
 "Demon of Rabaul" – Hiroyoshi Nishizawa, Imperial Japanese Navy Air Service fighter ace
 "Dizzy" – H. R. Allen, RAF fighter ace and author
 "Dogs" – John Dundas, RAF Battle of Britain fighter ace
 "Dogsbody" – Douglas Bader, RAF fighter ace (radio callsign while Wing Commander of Tangmere)
 "Dolfo" – Adolf Galland, German fighter ace
 "Dookie" – Jenna Dolan, first woman to fly the AV-8B Harrier II in combat
 "Dutch" – Petrus Hugo, South African WW2 pilot

E
 "The Eagle of Crimea" – Pavel V. Argeyev, Russian World War I flying ace

F
 "Fighter George" – Harold George, USAAC fighter ace (to distinguish him from "Bomber" George)
 "Fighter of Libau" – Erich Rudorffer, World War II German ace
 "Fish" – Herman Salmon, American test pilot
 "Flotte Lotte" – Charlotte Möhring, German female pilot
 "Flying Knight of the Northland"  – Clennell H. Dickins, Canadian pioneer bush pilot

G
 "Gabby" – Francis Gabreski, American Army Air Force fighter ace
 "Ginger" – James Lacey, British fighter ace
 "Grumpy" - George Unwin, British fighter ace, Battle of Britain

H
 "Hamish" – T. G. Mahaddie, Bomber Command pilot, Pathfinder Force
 "Hap" – Henry H. Arnold, American Army Air Forces commanding general
 "Hasse" – Hans Wind, Finnish fighter ace
 "Hilly" – Mark Henry Brown, Battle of Britain pilot
 "Hipshot" – Danny Hamilton, US Air Force Reserve
 "Hoagy" – Peter Carmichael, British fighter pilot
 "Hooter" – Steve Rainey, American test pilot
 "Hoppy" – Colin Hodgkinson, British fighter pilot
 "Huss" – F. Hussain, IMA, Col, US Air Force Reserve

I
 "Igo" – Ignaz Etrich, Austrian aviator and aircraft builder
 "Illu" – Ilmari Juutilainen, top Finnish World War II fighter ace

J
 "Jack" – John Frost, South African Air Force pilot
 "Jake" – Leon Swirbul, co-founder of Grumman Aircraft
 "JB" – James Brown, American test pilot
 "Jimmy" – John S. Thach, American Navy fighter ace
 "Johnnie" – James E. Johnson, British RAF fighter ace
 "Johnny" – George L. Johnson, British WW2 RAF bomber navigator

K
 "Kaos" – Art Nalls, American test pilot and air show pilot
 "Killer" – Clive Caldwell, Australian RAAF flying ace
 "Kinch" – Iven Kincheloe, American test pilot

L
 "Little Dragon" – Muhammad Mahmood Alam, Pakistani fighter ace
 "Lock" – Ormer Locklear, American stunt pilot
 "Lightning" – Joe Little, African American WW2 pilot (member of the Tuskegee Airmen)
 "Lucky Breeze" – George Scott, British Royal Naval Air Service pilot and airship pilot

M
 "The Mad Major" – Christopher Draper, British World War I fighter ace
 "Mick" – Edward Mannock, British World War I fighter ace
 "Mouse" – Gordon Cleaver, Battle of Britain pilot
 "Mutt" – Joseph Summers, British test pilot

O
 "One Armed Mac" – James MacLachlan, a British World War 2 ace who flew with a prosthetic arm

P
 "Paddy" 
 Hubert Adair, Battle of Britain pilot
 Brendan Finucane, Irish World War II RAF fighter ace
 W. H. Harbison, British RAF officer
 "Pancho" – Florence L. Lowe, American pioneer aviator
 "Pappy"
Greg Boyington, American World War II U.S. Marine Corps fighter ace
 Paul Gunn, American World War II Army Air Force bomber pilot
 "Pete" 
Frank K. Everest, Jr., American test pilot
Marc Mitscher, American World War II carrier admiral
Elwood R. Queseda, American fighter ace
 "Petit Rouge" – Manfred von Richthofen, German fighter ace
 "Pick" - Percy Charles Pickard, well known in England during the Second World War, KIA during the Amiens prison raid
 "Pritzl" – Heinz Bär, German fighter ace, because of his affection for Pritzl candy bars.
 "Punch" – Clennell H. Dickins, Canadian pioneer bush pilot

R
 "Ratsy" – George Preddy, P-51 Mustang ace
 "Red" – Eugene Tobin, American who flew with the RAF during the Battle of Britain
 "The Red Baron" (German, der Rote Baron) – Manfred von Richthofen, German fighter ace
 "The Red Battle-flyer" (German: der rote Kampfflieger) – Manfred von Richthofen, German fighter ace
 "The Red Knight" – Manfred von Richthofen, German fighter ace
 "Reeste" – Heinz Bär, German fighter ace

S
 "Sailor" – Adolph Malan, South African RAF fighter ace
 "Sandy" – Brian Lane, RAF Battle of Britain pilot,  Squadron Leader and fighter ace
 "Sexy Rexy" – Ola Mildred Rexroat, Women Airforce Service Pilot (WASP) aviator
 "Shorty" – Vernon Keogh, American who flew with the RAF during the Battle of Britain (named for diminutive height)
 "The Silver Fox" – Robert L. Stephens, record-setting American test pilot
 "Skip" – Jean Ziegler, American test pilot on Bell X-1 program
 "Slew" – John S. McCain, Sr., American naval aviator and chief of Bureau of Aeronautics
 "Snort" – Dale Snodgrass, American naval aviator, demonstration pilot, and commander of Fighter Wing, U.S. Atlantic Fleet
 "Snow Eagle" – Clennell H. Dickins, Canadian pioneer bush pilot
 "Spig" – Frank W. Wead, U.S. Navy aviator and screenwriter
 "Spuds" – Theodore Ellyson, pioneer U.S. Navy aviator
 "Stan" – Roderic Dallas, top Australian fighter ace of World War I
 "Stapme" – Gerald Stapleton, British Battle of Britain fighter ace
 "Strafer" – Geoffrey Warnes, No. 263 Squadron RAF
 "Stuffy" – Hugh Dowding, British commander of RAF Fighter Command from before the war into the Battle of Britain
 "Sawn Off Locky" – Eric Lock, Battle of Britain pilot

T
 "Taffy" – Trafford Leigh-Mallory, Fighter Command Group commander during the Battle of Britain
 "Tex" – David L. Hill, American fighter pilot
 "Tim" – John Elkington, Battle of Britain pilot
 "Timbertoes" – Sydney Carlin, Battle of Britain gunner who lost a leg in World War I
 "Titch" – George Palliser, Battle of Britain pilot

U
 "Uncle Wiggly Wings" – Gail S. Halvorsen, American Air Force officer

W
 "Wop" – Wilfrid R. May, Canadian pioneer bush pilot
 "Whitey" – Edward L. Feightner, American fighter ace and Blue Angels solo
 "White Eagle" – Clennell H. Dickins, Canadian pioneer bush pilot
 "Willie" – Hugh Wilson, RAF aviator
 "Winkle" – Eric Brown, British naval aviator and test pilot
 "Wrong Way" – Douglas Corrigan, American aviator (from having to lie to Civil Aeronautics Board to fly the Atlantic)

Z
 "Zulu"
 Albert Lewis, Battle of Britain pilot
 George Lloyd World War I pilot

See also

Nickname
Lists of nicknames – nickname list articles on Wikipedia

References

Lists of people with nickname by occupation